Doug is an American animated television series created by Jim Jinkins and produced by Jumbo Pictures. The series premiered on Nickelodeon in 1991, and ran until 1994. Nickelodeon declined to green-light a fifth season, and it was instead ordered by Disney's ABC. Disney also acquired the production company behind Doug, Jumbo Pictures. The fifth season premiered in 1996 and became a staple of Disney's One Saturday Morning block. The series continued for two more seasons and a film until 1999.

For the first four seasons (52 episodes), Doug episodes consisted of two stories per half-hour block, with the exceptions of "Doug Bags a Neematoad", "Doug's Halloween Adventure" and "Doug's Christmas Story" as they were full-length. The fifth through seventh seasons (65 episodes) consisted of one story per half-hour block.

A total of 117 episodes (166 segments) were produced over the course of seven seasons.

Series overview

Nickelodeon episodes (1991-94)

Season 1 (1991)
In the closing credits for this season, two different pieces of music would play: the first piece would be taken from the second story in the episode, and during the last third, Porkchop would don headphones and listen to music from the first story, immediately drowning out the original background music and angering Doug.

Unlike the other seasons, the Jumbo Pictures closing logo is different. It is still and takes place on a dark blue background.

Season 2 (1992)
Beginning with this season, only a single piece of music is played for the closing credits, though the animation is still the same until the fifth season.

Additionally, the more familiar Jumbo Pictures closing logo started to be used.

This season is also one of the only two seasons to not have any full-length episodes.

Season 3 (1993)
Along with the second season, this season is one of the only two seasons to not have any full-length episodes.

Season 4 (1993–94)

Disney episodes (1996-99)

Season 5 (1996–97)
In 1996, Jumbo Pictures was acquired by Disney. Disney greenlit a fifth season of Doug, which Nickelodeon had previously declined to order, for the Disney's One Saturday Morning block on ABC. This season introduced a new theme song and, at Jinkins' decision, some changes to the characters. In an interview, Jinkins said, "We'd already done a hundred and fifty some-odd stories, so our writing team was looking for a way to restart. The changes were my doing. I wanted to shake it up." To emphasize how the episodes were brand-new, this season was sometimes advertised as Brand Spanking New! Doug. As of this season, episodes are now made up of one 22-minute story. The ending credits also changed to where Doug chases Porkchop from left to right and then the latter chases the former to the left. The show started airing on ABC's One Saturday Morning Block.

Season 6 (1997)

Season 7 (1998–99)
In the final season, Brand Spanking New! Doug was renamed Disney's Doug. After production ended, all 65 episodes produced by Disney were repackaged under the Disney's Doug name for syndication on their Disney's One Too block, which commenced on UPN affiliates in September 1999. For the syndicated version, each episode was slightly edited, the end credits were completely redone, and new Doug shorts, featuring some of the characters from the show, were added in between commercial breaks.

Film (1999)

See also
 Doug
 List of Doug characters

References

Lists of American children's animated television series episodes
Lists of American comedy television series episodes
Lists of Nickelodeon television series episodes
Lists of Disney television series episodes
Doug (TV series)